Alsodes barrioi, the Cabreria spiny-chest frog, is a species of frog in the Alsodidae, endemic to Chile; it is only known from its type locality in the Cordillera de Nahuelbuta, Malleco Province. The specific name barrioi honors , a Spanish botanist and zoologist who lived in Argentina.

It is relatively abundant at the type locality. These frogs can be found under logs or stones close to mountain streams. The surrounding vegetation mainly comprises Nothofagus dombeyi and Araucaria araucana. The habitat is being afforested by introduced pines, and harvesting these would have dramatic consequences for the streams where these frogs breed.

References

barrioi
Amphibians of Chile
Endemic fauna of Chile
Amphibians described in 1981
Taxonomy articles created by Polbot